The Leaning Juniper Wind Project is an electricity generating wind farm facility located in Gilliam County, Oregon, United States with a total generating capacity of 301.5 megawatts. It is owned by PacifiCorp and began operations in 2006. Leaning Juniper I became operational in September 2006 with 67 1.5 MW wind turbines with a capacity of 100.5 megawatts. "Leaning Juniper II includes 133 GE 1.5 MW wind turbines with a capacity of 201 MW. This phase came online in 2011." The Jones Canyon Substation was built as part of this project and to support other wind projects in the area.

See also

List of wind farms in the United States
Wind power in Oregon

References

External links
 http://www.oregon.gov/ENERGY/SITING/LJW.shtml

Energy infrastructure completed in 2006
Energy infrastructure completed in 2011
Buildings and structures in Gilliam County, Oregon
Wind farms in Oregon
2006 establishments in Oregon